Hristo Dimitrov Uzunov (Bulgarian/; 22 February 1878 – 24 April 1905) was a Macedonian Bulgarian teacher and revolutionary, head of the Ohrid branch of the Internal Macedonian Revolutionary Organization and its ideological leader in the Ohrid region.

Revolutionary life

Uzunov was born in 1878 in Ohrid, then in Ottoman Empire. Both his father and mother were active in the Bulgarian national movement. After the establishment of the Principality of Bulgaria, his father moved to Sofia and worked as a librarian in the National Library. Uzunov became a member of the revolutionary movement in 1896, while he was studying in the Bulgarian Men's High School of Thessaloniki. Afterwards, he worked as a teacher in the Bulgarian Exarchate. After the murder of Dimitar Grdanov, a Serbian teacher in Ohrid by Metody Patchev, Uzunov, along with Patchev, Kiril Parlichev and Ivan Grupchev were arrested. Between January 1902 and March 1903 he was re-imprisoned in Bitola. He actively participated in the Ilinden Uprising in 1903. After Toma Davidov was killed in March 1903, Uzunov took over the leadership of the revolutionary organization in the Ohrid area.

On 23 July 1903, in the village of Kuratica, near Ohrid, the flag of Uzunov's cheta was consecrated. The flag was handed over to Uzunov and with it the regional cheta. Uzunov, along with his cheta, participated in the Ilinden Uprising. Between 1904 and 1905 he fought against Serbian guerrillas in Macedonia and tried to resolve of the organization's internal problems.

Death

In 1905 Uzunov went to Bitola and Kičevo with his cheta in order to gain control of the region. On 23 April 1905, they entered the village of Cer together with Vancho Sarbakov. On the night of 24 April they were surrounded by Ottoman forces and after using all of their ammunition, they decided to commit suicide. Prior to commiting suicide, Uzunov wrote a short letter addressed to all honourable revolutionaries.

He's buried in Cer, where he died.

References

1878 births
1905 deaths
People from Ohrid
People from Manastir vilayet
Bulgarian revolutionaries
Members of the Internal Macedonian Revolutionary Organization
Bulgarian educators
Macedonian Bulgarians
Bulgarian Men's High School of Thessaloniki alumni
Bulgarian people imprisoned abroad
Prisoners and detainees of the Ottoman Empire